Antonio Comi (born 26 July 1964) is an Italian former professional footballer who played as a central midfielder and the current general manager of Torino.

His son, Gianmario Comi, is also a footballer.

Club career

Torino
Comi grew up in the Torino youth sector and made his debut for the senior team on 20 Match 1983 against Fiorentina (2–0), replacing Carlo Borghi. On 18 May of that same year, Comi made his debut in Coppa Italia and scored his first goal for the Granata, doubling Torino's lead against Napoli. (2–0) in the quarter-finals.

He remained at Torino for six seasons, until the club was relegated to Serie B in 1989.

Roma
In 1989 Comi was sold to Roma, with whom he remained just little over five seasons. In November 1994, he transferred to Como in Serie B where he ended his career.

Post-career
He returned Torino in 2001 as technical coordinator of the youth sector, and later became head of the youth sector in 2003, a post he continued to hold even after the club went bankrupt in 2005 at the behest of the new president Urbano Cairo. On 29 July 2011 he was appointed Director at Torino. On 5 July 2014, his contract was renewed to 30 June 2016.

Career statistics

Club
As of 11 June 1995.

Honours

Club
Roma
 Coppa Italia: 1990–91

References

1964 births
Living people
Italian footballers
Italy under-21 international footballers
Association football midfielders
Serie A players
Serie B players
Torino F.C. players
A.S. Roma players
Como 1907 players